The San Diego State Aztecs women's cross country team represents San Diego State University in collegiate cross country. The Aztecs compete in the Mountain West Conference (MW) in Division I of the National Collegiate Athletic Association (NCAA).

Postseason
The Aztec women's cross country team has thus far appeared in the NCAA Women's Division I Cross Country Championship one time, with that appearance resulting in 7th place in the 1981–82 school year.

See also
 Aztec Hall of Fame

References

External links 
 

San Diego State Aztecs
Mountain West Conference cross country
College cross country teams in the United States